Givry is a commune in the Saône-et-Loire department in the region of Bourgogne-Franche-Comté in eastern France.

Geography
Located  from Chalon-sur-Saône, Givry is a small town, famous for its listed monuments and its wines. It is surrounded on the southeast by the commune's forest, and on the east by vineyards; the commune of Givry also includes three hamlets: Cortiambles, Poncey and Russilly.

History

Givry's foundation dates back to the Gallo-Roman era. Its fortifications were built in the Middle Ages. As of the 18th century, several architectural works were established.
Givry's AOC wine makes part of the Côte Chalonnaise wealth. It is said that Givry wine was French king Henry IV's favorite.

Givry's population is rising steadily as the town is a greatly sought-after residential area. Turned towards tourism, the town is crossed by the Green Way.
Jacques Doyen, fondateur de l'abbaye de Notre Dame de Cortiambles en 1299.
Dominique Vivant, first director of the Louvre museum

Twin towns
Givry is twinned with:
 Oppenheim, Germany

See also
Communes of the Saône-et-Loire department
Givry wine

References

Communes of Saône-et-Loire